"Ordinary" is the first single released off Wayne Brady's first album, A Long Time Coming released on August 19, 2008, peaking at number 41 on the Billboard Hot R&B/Hip-Hop Songs chart.

This song originally recorded in 2005 by TVXQ'S Beautiful Life for their album Rising Sun

Chart positions

References

2008 singles
Songs written by Jack Kugell
2008 songs